Saint Joseph Christian School is a private Christian school at 5401 Gene Field Road in Saint Joseph, Missouri.  It is a non-denominational school serving students from the Northwest Missouri and Northeast Kansas area. Local businessman Joe Gregory founded the school in 1988, after receiving a vision, while in a Texas hotel, to build a Christian school in St. Joseph.  He made a successful $30,000 sealed bid to buy the former Everett School at 14th and Olive in downtown St. Joseph, which had closed in 1985. In 2002, a new school was constructed on the city's northeast side. It is just south of the Word of Life Church megachurch in the 102 River bottoms. The school currently has 333 students in grades PreK-12. The school is divided into two sections: elementary (prekindergarten through 6th grade) and secondary (7th grade through 12th grade). The school's parent organization is the Area Ministers for Christ Corporation.

The St. Joseph Christian School football team won the state championship in 8-man football in 2006. It was runner up in 2004, 2008, 2009 and 2010. In 2019, the school partnered with Northland Christian School to expand its football team to 11-man. They have since separated to be 8-man again.

References

External links
Official school web page

Christian School
Christian schools in Missouri
Educational institutions established in 1988
High schools in Buchanan County, Missouri
Private high schools in Missouri
Private middle schools in Missouri
Private elementary schools in Missouri
1988 establishments in Missouri